Edgar Villamarín Arguedas (born 1 April 1982) is a Peruvian footballer who plays as a centre back.

International career
Villamarín also featured four times for the Peru national team.

Honours

Club 
Universitario de Deportes
 Torneo Descentralizado: 2009
FBC Melgar
 Torneo Descentralizado: 2015

External links

1982 births
Living people
Footballers from Lima
Association football fullbacks
Peruvian footballers
Peru international footballers
Peruvian Segunda División players
Peruvian Primera División players
Sporting Cristal footballers
Atlético Universidad footballers
Unión Huaral footballers
Cienciano footballers
FC Chornomorets Odesa players
Club Universitario de Deportes footballers
Club Alianza Lima footballers
FBC Melgar footballers
Alianza Atlético footballers
Club Deportivo Universidad César Vallejo footballers
Ukrainian Premier League players
Peruvian expatriate footballers
Expatriate footballers in Ukraine
Peruvian expatriate sportspeople in Ukraine
2007 Copa América players